Relativistic aberration is the relativistic version of aberration of light, including relativistic corrections that become significant for observers who move with velocities close to the speed of light. It is described by Einstein's special theory of relativity.

Suppose, in the reference frame of the observer, the source is moving with speed  at an angle  relative to the vector from the observer to the source at the time when the light is emitted. Then the following formula, which was derived by Einstein in 1905 from the Lorentz transformation, describes the aberration of the light source, measured by the observer:

In this circumstance, the rays of light from the source which reach the observer are tilted towards the direction of the source's motion (relative to the observer).  It is as if light emitted by a moving object is concentrated conically, towards its direction of motion; an effect called relativistic beaming.  Also, light received by a moving object (e.g. the view from a very fast spacecraft) also appears concentrated towards its direction of motion.

One consequence of this is that a forward observer should normally be expected to intercept a greater proportion of the object's light than a rearward one; this concentration of light in the object's forward direction is referred to as the "searchlight effect" (or headlight effect).

See also
Relativistic beaming
Aberration redshift
Doppler effect
Relativistic Doppler effect
Ives–Stilwell experiment
Time dilation
Stellar aberration (derivation from Lorentz transformation)
Aberration (astronomy)

External links 
Detailed explanation of relativistic aberration
"Did Einstein Misunderstand Aberration?" at MathPages.com

Special relativity
Light